Vydubychi (also Vydobychi, Vudobych, Vydobech) is a historical neighborhood in Ukrainian capital Kyiv. Geographically constituting a hill and a valley on the Right (western) Bank of the Dnipro River, it is now a part of the Pechersk district of the city.

The lower part of Vydubychi has evolved in a giant intermodal transport hub comprising the Kyiv Metro Vydubychi metro station, two railway stops Vydubychi railway station serving east bound trains, the Kyiv Urban Electric Train and the Kyiv Boryspil Express, and Vydubychi-Trypilski serving south bound trains, the Vydubychi bus terminal, two multi-level grade-separated interchanges: motorway interchange and railway interchange. The Vydubychi hub adjoins two major bridges: the Pivdennyi Bridge and New Darnytskyi Bridge.

The Vydubychi Monastery with its beautiful hill park is located in the neighborhood.

References

Neighborhoods in Kyiv
Transport in Kyiv